Emma Beatrice Tenayuca (December 21, 1916 – July 23, 1999) was an American labor leader, union organizer, and educator. She is best known for her work organizing Mexican workers in Texas during the 1930s, particularly for leading the 1938 San Antonio pecan shellers strike.

Early life 
Tenayuca grew up in a family of 11 but began living with her grandparents at an early age in order to ease the burden on her parents. She was born into a Mexican-American family, and their lineage in South Texas predated both Mexican independence and the Mexico-U.S. War. The Tenayuca family were hit hard by the Depression, and all around her, Emma began to see the suffering of low class workers.

Political involvement 

She became interested in activism and was a labor activist before graduating from Brackenridge High School in San Antonio. Tenayuca's first arrest came at the age of 16, in 1933, when she joined a picket line of workers in strike against the Finck Cigar Company. After high school, Tenayuca obtained a position as an elevator operator, but she continued working for human rights.

Labor union activism 
She founded two international ladies' garment workers unions, and was involved in both the Worker's Alliance of America and Woman's League for Peace and Freedom.  She organized a protest over the beating of Mexican migrants by United States Border Patrol agents. In her early adulthood she was arrested for a second and third time: once on a charge of "disturbing the peace" during a nonviolent protest, and again for her leadership role in a labor strike in 1938.
 
Organizing large scale strikes against the injustices in the labor sphere was also one of Tenayuca's vocations. Tenayuca was instrumental in one of the most famous conflicts of Texas labor history–the 1938 San Antonio pecan shellers strike at the Southern Pecan Shelling Company. Tenayuca was 21 years old at the time. During the strike, nearly 12,000 workers at over 130 plants protested a wage reduction of one cent per pound of shelled pecans and inhumane working conditions by walking off the job. Mexicana and Chicana workers who picketed were clubbed, gassed, arrested, and jailed. A photo of Tenayuca ran in Time magazine where she was called "the forefront of most of its civil commotions". The strike ended after thirty-seven days when the city's pecan operators agreed to arbitration.  In October that year, the Fair Labor Standards Act raised wages to twenty-five cents an hour.

Another source of Tenayuca's first-hand knowledge of the struggles of working people came from visits as a young child to the Plaza del Zacate, which means a grass plaza, a public square where socialists and anarchists would come to speak and work with families with grievances. Because it advocated her passion for minority rights, Tenayuca joined the Communist Party in 1936. Then, less than a year later, she was scheduled to speak at a small Communist Party meeting at the Municipal Auditorium permitted by San Antonio Mayor Maury Maverick. A crowd of 5,000 attacked the auditorium with bricks and rocks, "huntin' Communists". Police helped Tenayuca escape from the mob, but she was blacklisted and forced to move out of San Antonio.

Many of the Mexican and Mexican Americans in San Antonio at the time had fled the Mexican Revolution during 1910s and were excluded from the New Deal's jobs and housing programs. Additionally, Mexican Americans were facing massive deportations stoked by fears that they were stealing U.S. jobs and due to reduced jobs available during the Great Depression.

In 1940, Tenayuca was the Communist Party nominee for the U.S. House of Representatives in Texas's 20th congressional district. She finished a distant third to the Democratic and Republican candidates, winning 76 votes out of 56,447 cast.

Education and personal life 

In 1938 she married organizer Homer Bartchy who used the alias "Homer Brooks". Eventually, Tenayuca went on to pursue a college degree. She divorced Brooks in 1941 and left her hometown in order to attend San Francisco State College where she majored in Education. Tenayuca divorced her husband and fell out of love with communism as well after learning of Joseph Stalin’s terror regime. She later earned a master's in education from Our Lady of the Lake University in San Antonio. From there she went on to teach in Harlandale School District until her retirement in 1982. Shortly after retirement Emma Tenayuca developed Alzheimer's disease and died on July 23, 1999.

Legacy 
Tenayuca continued to inspire activists until and beyond her death. The admiration felt for her can be seen in That's Not Fair! Emma Tenayuca's Struggle for Justice, a bilingual children's book that tells the story of her contributions to the pecan sheller strike, as well as in the play-dramas written to honor her dedication and contributions. A full biography of Tenayuca's life is in the process of being written by her niece scheduled for publication in 2021. The South Texas Civil Rights Project has dedicated an annual award, The Emma Tenayuca Award, given to individuals working to protect civil rights. Tenyuca earned the nickname "La Pasionaria de Texas" (Spanish for "The Passionate One") due to her many demonstrations in the face of numerous arrests.

The Party of Communists USA has a chapter named in her honor.

See also 

 Manuela Solis Sager

References

Further reading

External links

 Interview with Emma Tenayuca, February 21, 1987, University of Texas at San Antonio: Institute of Texan Cultures: Oral History Collections, UA 15.01, University of Texas at San Antonio Libraries Special Collections.
 "That's Not Fair! Emma Tenayuca's Struggle for Justice/¡No Es Justo!: La lucha de Emma Tenayuca por la justicia"

1916 births
1999 deaths
American trade union leaders
American people of Mexican descent
People from San Antonio
Activists from Texas
Women trade union leaders
Brackenridge High School alumni
20th-century American women
20th-century American people